RLU may refer to:
 Rectified linear unit, a neuron activation function used in neural networks, usually referred to as an ReLU
 Relative light unit, a unit for measuring cleanliness by measuring the levels of Adenosine Triphosphate
 Remote line unit, a type of switch in the GTD-5 EAX switching system
 RLU-1 Breezy, an American homebuilt aircraft design
 Rusline, a Russian airline whose ICAO airline code is RLU